Acrida conica, the giant green slantface, is a species of grasshopper found in Australia and New Guinea. It was originally described in 1781 as Truxalis conicus.

References

conica
Orthoptera of Oceania
Insects described in 1781